Ollie & Jerry was an American dance-pop duo active in the 1980s, consisting of drummer Ollie E. Brown and R&B singer/bassist Jerry Knight.

Despite releasing no studio albums under their own name, they are still widely known for their hit single "Breakin'... There's No Stopping Us", a dance-influenced track which became a top 10 hit in both the United States and the United Kingdom, and was featured as the theme to the film Breakin' and released  on its accompanying soundtrack. However, the group disbanded in mid-1985, after the release of their second single "Electric Boogaloo". As a result, "Electric Boogaloo" failed to repeat the success of "Breakin'..." and the duo is widely considered a one-hit wonder.

History
Ollie Brown and Jerry Knight had previously worked together as session musicians, with Knight having also been a member of R&B group Raydio, to whose albums Brown had frequently contributed as a session drummer. The two formed Ollie & Jerry in Los Angeles, California in 1984, signing to Polydor Records. The duo recorded the song "Breakin'... There's No Stopping Us" as the title theme to the 1984 film Breakin', and released as the first single from the film's soundtrack album. The single became a hit, peaking at No. 5 on the UK Singles Chart and at No. 9 on the Billboard Hot 100 in 1984. The group then did some promotion for the song, performing on the syndicated television program Soul Train in the midst of the success of the song. The Breakin' soundtrack went on to peak at No. 8 on the US Billboard 200 albums chart.

The following year, the duo released the single "Electric Boogaloo", the title theme to the Breakin' sequel Breakin' 2: Electric Boogaloo. The single did fairly well on the UK Singles Chart, peaking at No. 57 on the chart. However, the song failed to chart on the Billboard Hot 100; it did, however, find some minor success on the Billboard Hot R&B/Hip-Hop Songs and Hot Dance Club Play charts, peaking at the positions of No. 45 and No. 43 respectively. After the song's release, the duo split in mid-1985.

Discography

Singles

References

External links
Discography at Discogs.

Musical groups established in 1984
American pop music groups
American dance music groups
American musical duos